The 1913–14 season is the 4th season of competitive football by Ayr United.

Competitions

Friendly and benefit matches

Scottish First Division

Matches

Scottish Qualifying Cup

Ayr Charity Cup

Statistics

League table

Results by round

References

Ayr United F.C. seasons
Ayr United